Iheyaspira bathycodon is a species of small sea snail, a marine gastropod mollusc in the family Skeneidae.

Distribution
This species occurs off the Von Damm Vent Field, Mid-Cayman spreading center, in the Caribbean Sea, at a depth of 2,300 m.

Description

References

bathycodon
Gastropods described in 2013